Non-imprinted in Prader-Willi/Angelman syndrome region protein 2 is a protein that in humans is encoded by the NIPA2 gene.

References

Further reading